Basildon University Hospital is an acute district general hospital in Basildon, Essex. It is managed by the Mid and South Essex NHS Foundation Trust.

History
The hospital opened in 1973. Facilities which it replaced included St. Andrew's Hospital in Billericay which subsequently became a regional plastic surgery and rehabilitation unit. The Essex Cardiothoracic Centre, which was built at a cost of £60 million, was opened by Prime Minister Gordon Brown at Basildon University Hospital in July 2007.

Performance
The Care Quality Commission rated Basildon University Hospital overall as good.

Basildon Hospital Radio
Basildon Hospital Radio provides radio services in the hospital.

References

External links 

 
 Inspection reports from the Care Quality Commission
 
 
 

Hospitals in Essex
NHS hospitals in England
Hospital radio stations